The 1966–67 season was Liverpool Football Club's 75th season in existence and their fifth consecutive season in the First Division. Their win against Everton at Goodison Park at least gave Liverpool the Charity Shield, but they were humbled by Ajax, led by a young Johan Cruyff, in the European Cup. Liverpool finished fifth in the table, with arch rivals Manchester United winning the championship instead.

Squad

Goalkeepers
  Tommy Lawrence
  John Ogston

Defenders
  Gerry Byrne

  Chris Lawler
  Ian Ross
  Tommy Smith
  Ron Yeats

Midfielders
  Alf Arrowsmith
  Ian Callaghan
  Gordon Milne
  Willie Stevenson
  Ian St. John
  Gordon Wallace
  Peter Thompson
  David Wilson

Attackers
  Bobby Graham
  Roger Hunt
  Geoff Strong
  Ted MacDougall

First Division

Table

Matches

FA Charity Shield

FA Cup

European Cup

References
 LFC History.net – 1966-67 season
 Liverweb - 1966-67 Season

Liverpool F.C. seasons
Liverpool